Clostridium methoxybenzovorans is a strictly anaerobic and spore-forming bacterium from the genus Clostridium which has been isolated from olive mill wastewater from Sfax in Tunisia.

References

Bacteria described in 1999
luticellarii